is an American actor. He was born in Kuwait. Tsuji is best known for his performance as Jin Sakai in the video game Ghost of Tsushima (2020) and as the Crown Prince in the TV series The Man in the High Castle (2015–2019).

Early life
Daisuke was born to Japanese parents. His father Hirohiko Tsuji worked in Kuwait as an architect when he was born. His brother Hisayasu Tsuji is an editor. At two years old he moved to Chiba in Japan and at eight years old he moved to Sacramento, California. He attended the Rio Americano High School and American River College. He gained a bachelor in Theatre Arts at UCLA.

Career 

He worked at The Coffee Bean & Tea Leaf in The Grove at Farmers Market, LA. He started working in Los Angeles at two theatre companies, Tim Robbins' The Actors' Gang and The Three Chairs Theatre Company. He was a party clown before he became a professional clown at Cirque du Soleil. went on several tours in the US and internationally such as Speak Theater Arts' and Cirque du Soleil's Dralion. He created his own clown shows called: Death and Giggles, Limerence, and Clowns are Peoples Too. In 2006, he played a cave soldier in Letters from Iwo Jima. In 2009, Tsuji wrote and directed Monkey Madness which was produced by the theatre troupe The Los Angeles Theatre Ensemble. The same year, he also wrote and starred in Death and Giggles. In 2010, he became a company member of Oregon Shakespeare Festival in 2010, and appeared in more than 10 productions. In 2013, he returned to Los Angeles to focus on television and movies. In 2019, he was Chief Warrant Officer Lee in the Love, Death & Robots TV series on Netflix. He also did voice acting for the video games Call of Duty: Black Ops 4 (2018) and Prey: Mooncrash (2018). In 2017, Tsuji played William Shakespeare in the three-act play Imogen Says Nothing.

In 2020, he was the voice actor and face of the protagonist Jin Sakai in the samurai themed, action-adventure game Ghost of Tsushima. He was the Crown Prince in the TV series The Man in the High Castle (2015–2019) on Amazon Prime. In 2019, he won the Los Angeles Drama Critics Circle Award for Outstanding Featured Performance in Cambodian Rock Band at South Coast Rep!.

Filmography

Film

Television

Video games

Stage

Awards and nominations

References

External links

Living people
Actors from Chiba Prefecture
American male actors of Japanese descent
American male film actors
American male television actors
American male video game actors
American male voice actors
American film actors of Asian descent
Japanese emigrants to the United States
Male actors from Sacramento, California
People from Chiba (city)
21st-century American male actors
Year of birth missing (living people)